Bacup railway station served the town of Bacup, Rossendale, Lancashire, England, from 1852 until closure in 1966 and was the terminus of two lines; one from  and the other from .

History

Opened by the East Lancashire Railway, it was taken over by the Lancashire and Yorkshire Railway following the former's merger, and it became part of the London, Midland and Scottish Railway during the Grouping of 1923. It was then closed by the British Railways Board as a result of the Beeching cuts of the mid-1960s. The line was cut back to Rawtenstall in 1966. Until the very day of closure in 1966 trains ran every half an hour (every fifteen minutes on Saturdays) and was a well used line until the end.

Few traces of the station remain today, as the site has now been redeveloped and built over.

References

 
 
 
Lost Railways of Lancashire by Gordon Suggitt

External links
 Bacup station on navigable O.S. map
 Old photos of Bacup station
 Photo of the old station site and route towards Rawtenstall

Disused railway stations in the Borough of Rossendale
Former Lancashire and Yorkshire Railway stations
Beeching closures in England
Railway stations in Great Britain opened in 1852
Railway stations in Great Britain closed in 1966
1852 establishments in England